The Jhinwar is a caste found in the states of Punjab and Uttar Pradesh in India.

Traditionally, the Jhinwar community found in Punjab and Uttar Pradesh, 

Communities that are related to the Jhinwar by occupation in Uttar Pradesh include the Batham, Bind, Bhar, Dhewar, Dhimar, Gariya, Gaur, Godia, Gond, Guria, Jhimar, Jhir, Jhiwar, Kahar,Kharwar, Khairwar, Kumhar, Majhi, Majhwar, Prajapati, Rajbhar, Riakwar, Tura,  Turah, Turaha, Tureha and Turaiha. There were proposals in 2013 that some or all of these communities in the state should be reclassified as Scheduled Castes under India's system of positive discrimination; this would have involved declassifying them from the Other Backwards Class category. Whether or not this would happen was a significant issue in the campaign for the 2014 Indian general election.

References

Fishing castes
Social groups of Punjab, India
Social groups of Uttar Pradesh